(born 8 September 1985 in Kanagawa Prefecture, Japan) is a Japanese actress. Her movies include Koi wa Go-Shichi-Go! (2005), Negative Happy Chainsaw Edge (2008) and Dragonball Evolution (2009).

Filmography

TV dramas
Ganbatte Ikimasshoi (KTV, 2005)
Seishun Energy Mo Hitotsu no Sugar & Spice (Fuji TV, 2006)
Flight Panic (Fuji TV, 2007)
Life (Fuji TV, 2007)
Aiba Monogatari (Fuji TV, 2008)
Sunao ni Narenakute (Fuji TV, 2010)
Switched (Netflix, 2018)

Movies
Koi wa Go Shichi Go! (2005)
8 gatsu no Kurisumasu (2005)
Warau Michael (2006)
Hachimitsu to Clover (2006)
Curling Love (2007)
Negative Happy Chainsaw Edge (2007)
Mirai Yosouzu (2007)
Houtai Club / Bandage Club (2007)
Ahiru Kamo no Coin Locker (2007)
Suteki na Yoru, Boku ni Kudasai (2007)
Twilight Syndrome: Dead Cruise (2008)
Dragonball Evolution (2009)
Liar Game: The Final Stage (2010)
Sword of Desperation (2010)
Funny Bunny (2021)

References

External links
 

1985 births
Living people
Actresses from Kanagawa Prefecture
Japanese film actresses
Japanese television actresses
21st-century Japanese actresses
Stardust Promotion artists